Uniform Function Call Syntax (UFCS) or Uniform Calling Syntax (UCS) or sometimes Universal Function Call Syntax is a programming language feature in D and Nim that allows any function to be called using the syntax for method calls (as in object-oriented programming), by using the receiver as the first parameter, and the given arguments as the remaining parameters. UFCS is particularly useful when function calls are chained (behaving similar to pipes, or the various dedicated operators available in functional languages for passing values through a series of expressions).  It allows free-functions to fill a role similar to extension methods in some other languages. Another benefit of the method call syntax is use with "dot-autocomplete" in IDEs, which use type information to show a list of available functions, dependent on the context. When the programmer starts with an argument, the set of potentially applicable functions is greatly narrowed down, aiding discoverability.

Examples

Nim programming language 
type Vector = tuple[x, y: int]
 
proc add(a, b: Vector): Vector =
  (a.x + b.x, a.y + b.y)
 
let
  v1 = (x: -1, y: 4)
  v2 = (x: 5, y: -2)
 
  # all the following are correct
  v3 = add(v1, v2)
  v4 = v1.add(v2)
  v5 = v1.add(v2).add(v4)

D programming language 
import std.stdio;

int first(int[] arr)
{
    return arr[0];
}

int[] addone(int[] arr)
{
    int[] result;
    foreach (value; arr) {
        result ~= value + 1;
    }
    return result;
}

void main()
{
    auto a = [0, 1, 2, 3];

    // all the following are correct and equivalent
    int b = first(a);
    int c = a.first();
    int d = a.first;

    // chaining
    int[] e = a.addone().addone();
}

C++ proposal 
Proposals for a unification of member function and free function calling syntax have been discussed from the early years of C++ standardization. Glassborow (2004) proposed a Uniform Calling Syntax (UCS), allowing specially annotated free functions to be called with member function notation.
It has more recently been proposed (as of 2016) for addition to C++ by Bjarne Stroustrup and Herb Sutter, to reduce the ambiguous decision between writing free functions and member functions, to simplify the writing of templated code. Many programmers are tempted to write member functions to get the benefits of the member function syntax (e.g. "dot-autocomplete" to list member functions); however, this leads to excessive coupling between classes.

Rust usage of the term 
Until 2018 it was common to use this term when actually referring to qualified/explicit path syntax and most commonly the Fully Qualified Path syntax.: because it's possible to have several traits defining the same method implemented on the same struct, a mechanism is needed to disambiguate which trait should be used.

Member functions can also be used as free functions through a qualified (namespaced) path.

The term UFCS is incorrect for these uses, as it allows using methods as (namespaced) free functions, but not using free functions as methods.

See also
 Trait (computer programming)
 Interface (computer programming)
 Go (programming language), another language with a more open philosophy to methods
 Loose coupling
 Duck typing
 Method chaining

References

Object-oriented programming
Source code
Subroutines
Articles with example code